Filmways, Inc. (also known as Filmways Pictures and Filmways Television) was a television and film production company founded by American film executive Martin Ransohoff and Edwin Kasper in 1952. It is probably best remembered as the production company of CBS’ “rural comedies” of the 1960s, including Mister Ed, The Beverly Hillbillies, Petticoat Junction, and Green Acres, as well as the comedy-drama The Trials of O'Brien, the western Dundee and the Culhane, the adventure show Bearcats!, the police drama Cagney & Lacey, and The Addams Family. Notable films the company produced include The Sandpiper, The Cincinnati Kid, The Fearless Vampire Killers, Ice Station Zebra, Summer Lovers, The Burning, King, Brian De Palma's Dressed to Kill and Blow Out, and Death Wish II.

Filmways acquired famous companies throughout the years, such as Heatter-Quigley Productions, Ruby-Spears Productions and American International Pictures. It was also the owner of the film distributor Sigma III Corporation (Closely Watched Trains, Hi, Mom!), and Wally Heider Recording in Hollywood.

History 
Filmways was formed in 1952 by Martin Ransohoff and Edwin Kasper, who would part with Filmways five years later. The company originally produced television commercials and documentary films. In 1959, Filmways entered the television sitcom arena in a big way when many executives of McCadden Productions (a production company founded by comedian and actor George Burns) joined Filmways following McCadden's Chapter 7 bankruptcy earlier the same year. Filmways TV Productions was formed with former McCadden executive Al Simon as president, producing its first TV series, 21 Beacon Street. During that time, McCadden also produced the pilot which would later become the series Mister Ed. Burns sold the rights to Filmways, and Burns and director Arthur Lubin formed The Mister Ed Company as a joint venture. As a result, Mister Ed became a smash hit. From 1962 until 1971, Filmways produced its biggest hit, The Beverly Hillbillies for CBS, created by Paul Henning, another former McCadden executive. In 1969, the company acquired Heatter-Quigley Productions, the game show producer known for their biggest hit, Hollywood Squares. 

In 1969, the company bought Sears Point Raceway in Sonoma County, California, and Wally Heider's recording studios in Hollywood and San Francisco. Filmways was also listed as a co-developer of Ontario Motor Speedway in San Bernardino County, California, which opened in 1970. In 1972, Ransohoff left Filmways as president.

Filmways housed studios in Manhattan at 246 East 127th Street, which were built for Metro-Goldwyn-Mayer in the 1920s.

In 1974, it acquired book publisher Grosset & Dunlap from American Financial Group. In May 1975, it revived the television syndication firm Rhodes Productions after former parent Taft Broadcasting renamed the original company to Taft, H-B Program Sales two weeks ago. In 1976, Richard L. Bloch became CEO. In 1977, it founded Ruby-Spears Productions with former Hanna-Barbera alumni Joe Ruby and Ken Spears. Later that year, Rhodes Productions was spun off into an independent corporation, and launched its syndication unit Filmways Enterprises, headed by Jamie Kellner. On July 12, 1979, after Arkoff's retirement, Filmways purchased American International Pictures (AIP). Their TV subsidiary, AITV was eventually merged into Filmways Enterprises.

Filmways had lost nearly $20 million during the nine months ending in November 1981. However, it partially exited bankruptcy by selling a few of its previously acquired assets. In 1981, Ruby-Spears Productions was sold to Taft Broadcasting, owners of the Hanna-Barbera animation studio and Sears Point Raceway was sold to Speedway Motorsports. In 1982, Grosset & Dunlap was sold to G. P. Putnam's Sons.

In February 1982, Filmways was acquired by Orion Pictures (with E. M. Warburg Pincus & Company and Home Box Office (HBO) for its pay and cable television rights). Filmways was then reincorporated as Orion Pictures Corporation on August 31, 1982.

Announcements at the end of productions 

Most productions ended with the announcement, “This has been a Filmways presentation”. For some shows, the voice-over was made by a cast member:
 Petticoat Junction: first, Billie Jo Bradley (Jeannine Riley) and later, Betty Jo Bradley (Linda Kaye Henning)
 Green Acres: Lisa Douglas (Eva Gabor), who says, “This has been a Filmways presentation, darling.”
 The Beverly Hillbillies: Elly May Clampett (Donna Douglas). Following a few episodes, the voice of Jethro, Max Baer Jr., can be heard saying, "Aww, shuddup, Elly May", following her announcement. Seasons 1–3, however, feature Bill Baldwin, the announcer for the show's sponsors.
 Mister Ed: Roger Addison (Larry Keating). Later seasons feature Mister Ed (Allan Lane) saying it after Keating's death in 1963.
 The Addams Family: The logo was silent, but in some episodes the phrase was recited in a deep baritone voice by Ted Cassidy, although he did not use his usual “Lurch” voice. A few other times, Carolyn Jones recited the phrase and added "darling" at the end.

Ownership of film, television properties 
Today, most of the Filmways library, including Green Acres, The Addams Family, Cagney & Lacey (continued by Orion), Death Wish II (a Cannon film), The Hollywood Squares, and Mister Ed is now owned by Metro-Goldwyn-Mayer (MGM; via its acquisition of Orion in 1998, and the pre-1988 Cannon Films library) until MGM quietly relaunched Orion on September 11, 2014.

The Beverly Hillbillies and Petticoat Junction are owned by Paramount Global. Viacom (the parent of CBS from 1999 to 2005, actually started as CBS’ syndication arm) syndicated these two programs since the 1970s. In the case of Hillbillies, Orion Television (now a subsidiary of MGM Television in 2013) still owns the copyrights to the episodes, excluding episodes from the first season and the first half of the second season, which have fallen into the public domain. However, any new compilation of Hillbillies material will be copyrighted by either MPI Media Group or CBS, depending on the series content.

Filmways co-produced Eye Guess, The Face Is Familiar, Personality, and You're Putting Me On with Bob Stewart Productions. Those four game shows are currently owned by Sony Pictures Television (SPT). Filmways syndicated Mary Hartman, Mary Hartman that was produced by T.A.T. Communications Company. That too is owned by SPT via ELP Communications. SPT co-distributed the MGM library for a short time.

The rights to nearly all movies Filmways co-produced with major studios have been retained by the studios that originally released them; 10 Rillington Place is owned by Columbia Pictures, Save the Tiger is owned by Paramount Pictures, Two-Minute Warning, is owned by Universal Studios, and so forth. Most of the foreign-language films released by their Sigma III division have reverted to their original producers, but a small number of English-language films Sigma III handled such as Cul-de-sac and Hi, Mom! were retained by Filmways and are now owned by MGM. The rest that were originally released by MGM prior to 1986 are currently owned by Warner Bros. via its Turner Entertainment Co. subsidiary.

Television series

Feature films

References 

 
American companies established in 1952
American companies disestablished in 1982
Mass media companies established in 1952
Mass media companies disestablished in 1982
Defunct American film studios
Film distributors of the United States
Film production companies of the United States
Television production companies of the United States
Companies based in Sonoma County, California
Defunct companies based in California
1952 establishments in the United States
1982 disestablishments in California
Former Metro-Goldwyn-Mayer subsidiaries
1952 establishments in California